M People (stylised as MPeople) is an English dance music band that formed in 1990 and achieved success throughout most of the 1990s. The name M People is taken from the first letter of the first name of band member Mike Pickering, who formed the group. In December 2016, Billboard magazine ranked them as the 83rd most successful dance act of all time. M People have sold over 11 million records worldwide

Career

Formation
Pickering had been a member of Factory Records dance act Quando Quango, but became more noted as one of the original DJs at The Haçienda. Paul Heard was a member of acid jazz band Ace of Clubs, and Shovell had previously been in the collective Natural Life. The original plan had been to have a roster of different singers for different songs but having been spotted by Pickering and Heard, Heather Small became the distinctive vocalist of the group. She had been in the English soul band Hot House, which had released a number of critically acclaimed records without scoring any major success.

Northern Soul and breakthrough
Their first release came in the form of "Colour My Life", a limited white label pressing which got them some recognition, but it was the first official single "How Can I Love You More?" that gave them their first Top 30 hit and a following in and around the Manchester club scene, where Pickering was still DJing. Their first album Northern Soul provided other singles, including a full release of "Colour My Life", "Someday" and "Excited", followed by a re-release and repackaging of the album.

Elegant Slumming and success
1993 started with the re-released and remixed single from 1991's "How Can I Love You More?" which was released at the end of January and provided the band with their first Top 10 single, peaking at number 8. While this single was in the chart the band were working on new material for the second album to be released that autumn; a preliminary single, "One Night in Heaven" was released in the summer and peaked at number 6. It provided them with a dance/pop success that set up a bigger worldwide hit with the second single, "Moving On Up". The album Elegant Slumming went into the Top 5 on release and peaked at No. 2, remaining on the chart until the following summer and later winning the band a Mercury Music Prize. A further two Top 10 singles followed: "Don't Look Any Further" (a cover of the Dennis Edwards song, the video for which was shot in Berlin) in December, and "Renaissance" which was used as the theme tune to the BBC 2 show, The Living Soap, sending the single to number 5 in the UK Singles Chart.

Bizarre Fruit II and awards
In 1994 and 1995, M People won the BRIT Award for Best British Dance Act, the latter as a result of the release of Bizarre Fruit. The first single from that album was "Sight for Sore Eyes" which climbed to number 6, helping the album to enter the UK Albums Chart and peak at No. 4 and stay in the Top 10 for four months into the following year. The second single from the album was "Open Your Heart", which became their seventh consecutive Top Ten hit in two years and at the Brit Awards '95 they collaborated with Sting on his track "If You Love Somebody Set Them Free". Their third single "Search for the Hero" was later used in the TV advertising campaign for the Peugeot 406.  The song got to number 9 in the chart.

In 1995, the band embarked on their first world tour entitled the Come Again Tour and two more singles were lifted from a re-issued album: Bizarre Fruit II which charted and peaked one place higher at number 3; these singles were a remixed "Love Rendezvous" and "Itchycoo Park". The former was the least successful single from the album charting at number 32, and the latter was a cover of The Small Faces 1967 single, which charted at number 11, although the choice of the latter song to cover drew negative comments from the media.

In the United States, their biggest success was on the Hot Dance Music/Club Play chart, where they achieved five Top 5 singles, four of which hit number one.

After touring and promotion of Bizarre Fruit II for 18 months the band took a break in 1996. The album, having been released in November 1995, did not leave the chart until April 1997, becoming one of the biggest selling albums of the decade. They made some outdoor live UK performances called the Summer M Parties in June 1996, at Crystal Palace, Alton Towers plus a televised performance on BBC 1 on 29 June 1996 from Old Trafford, Manchester for The Crowd are on the Pitch: The Euro '96 Extravanganza, where they performed along with bands Dodgy, Madness and fellow Mancunians Simply Red and comedians Nick Hancock and Jo Brand to a crowd of 60,000 at party celebrating the Euro 1996 football championships.

Return and Fresco
In March 1997, lead singer Heather Small gave birth to her son. With the closure by BMG of the deConstruction label in 1996, the band founded their own record label, M People Records, to release the forthcoming album. In September they released the lead single "Just for You", which peaked at number 8 on the chart and two weeks later, their album Fresco, was released and went in the UK Albums Chart at number two, going on to sell 1.1 million copies and certified platinum. The band achieved their third multi-platinum selling album and this time appeared on Jools Holland's BBC 2 show, performing album tracks "Never Mind Love", "Angel St" and Small also performed, solo, the million-selling charity single that she appeared on, "Perfect Day".

Fresco also bore the single, "Fantasy Island" (number 33) and went on a fifteen-date UK Tour supporting the album to rave reviews. The final single lifted off the album was "Angel St" which got to number 8 and earned them their tenth Top 10 chart hit in March 1998, making the band one of the most consistent hit-makers of the 1990s on both sales and airplay.

The Best of M People
During the middle of 1998, the band prepared for their fifth album, a compilation entitled The Best of M People which also contained three new tracks: "Testify", "Dreaming" and a cover of the Doobie Brothers classic: "What a Fool Believes". The album went on to sell 1.75 million, peaked at number 2 and was certified 3× platinum. Of the three new tracks, "Testify" and "Dreaming" were released as singles. "Testify" got to number 12 in October 1998 and "Dreaming" got to number 13 in February 1999, their eighteenth and final single to date.

After the release of The Best of M People, the band took an extended hiatus. Heather Small recorded a successful solo album: Proud and it seemed that the band had split. However, a re-packaged greatest hits album entitled Ultimate Collection and released in 2005 led the band to embark on a short promotional tour of the UK. Small continued to pursue a solo career releasing her second solo album Close to a Miracle in 2006.

M People toured once again in 2007 as part of the Forestry Commission's 2007 Forest Tours at Delamere Forest, Cheshire; Dalby Forest, North Yorkshire Moors; Thetford Forest, Suffolk and Westonbirt Arboretum, Wiltshire to support The Forestry Commission's social and environmental programmes. Small said: "We have played in many different locations but never in forests so we’re really looking forward to doing these gigs". In addition to these gigs M People performed at the Hampton Court Festival in Surrey, London on 12 June 2007, and the Chichester Real Ale and Jazz festival on 4 July 2007. Elsewhere, they played a concert in Warsaw, Poland on 7 September 2007. The band also played some festival dates in 2008 before Small starred as a contestant in that year's BBC1's Strictly Come Dancing in the UK.

In 2012, as part of a series of Summer Concerts in Kew Gardens from 3–8 July, M People were one of five acts performing live on each day of the five days. The other acts included Status Quo, Will Young, James Morrison and the Gipsy Kings. M People performed a 60-minute set on Wednesday 4 July supported by Chic featuring Nile Rodgers.

2013 Greatest Hits Tour
In April 2013, it was announced that the band would undertake an extensive fourteen date Greatest Hits Tour in October to mark 20 years since the release of the Mercury Music Prize-winning album Elegant Slumming. This was the band's first UK Tour since 2005's Ultimate Collection Tour, although Pickering did not take part.

2020 box set
In 2019, it was announced that a box set of the M People catalogue was scheduled to be released. The box set, titled Renaissance, was released in March 2020 and included all five of the group's albums, as well as a large selection of bonus remixes and two DVDs that presented the group's music videos and live performances from the Come Again tour. Also included was a book with notes from the band, rare photos and a handwritten copy of the lyrics to "Search for the Hero".

Band members 
Heather Small (born 20 January 1965, London) – vocals (1990–present)
Mike Pickering (born 24 February 1958, Manchester) – keyboards, programming (1990–present)
Paul Heard (born 5 October 1960, London) – keyboards, programming (1990–present)
Shovell (born Andrew Lovell, 11 February 1969, South East London) – percussion (1992–present)

Discography

Studio albums
Northern Soul (1991)
Elegant Slumming (1993)
Bizarre Fruit (1994)
Bizarre Fruit II (1995)
Fresco (1997)

Compilations and other albums
The Best of M People (1998)
Testify (1999)
Ultimate Collection (2005)
Ultimate Collection: The Remixes (2005)
One Night in Heaven: The Best of M People (2007)

Awards

Brit Awards
The Brit Awards are the British Phonographic Industry's annual pop music awards.

|-
| rowspan="3" | 1994
| rowspan="6" | M People
| British Dance Act
| 
|-
| British Producer
| 
|-
| rowspan="2" | British Group
| 
|-
| rowspan="2" | 1995
| 
|-
| rowspan="2" | British Dance Act
| 
|-
| 1996
| 
|}

Ivor Novello Awards
The Ivor Novello Awards, named after the Cardiff born entertainer Ivor Novello, are awards for songwriting and composing. They are presented annually in London by the British Academy of Songwriters, Composers and Authors (BASCA) and were first introduced in 1955. 

|-
| 1994
| "Moving On Up"
| Best Contemporary Song 
|

Mercury Prize
The Mercury Prize is an annual music prize awarded for the best album from the United Kingdom and Ireland.

|-
| 1994
| Elegant Slumming
| Mercury Prize
| 
|}

NME Awards
The NME Awards are annual music awards show founded by the music magazine NME.

|-
| 1996
| M People
| Best Dance Act 
|

Silver Clef Awards
The Silver Clef Award are an annual UK music awards lunch which has been running since 1976. M People has received one award.

|-
| 1999
| M People
| Silver Clef Award 
|

See also
List of number-one dance hits (United States)
List of artists who reached number one on the US Dance chart

References

External links
[ M People at Allmusic]
M People's Elegant Sofa (Wayback Machine archived version retrieved 23 January 2010.)
M People full official chart history at Official Charts Company
Discography & History
 

English dance music groups
British soul musical groups
Brit Award winners
Musical groups from Manchester
English house music groups
Musical groups established in 1990
1990 establishments in England